Natalia Dumitresco (born Natalia Dumitrescu; 20 December 1915 in Bucharest, Romania – 3 July 1997 in Chars, France) was a French-Romanian abstract painter associated with the Réalités Nouvelles salon of Paris after the Second World War, a movement influenced by the art of Wassily Kandinsky and Alberto Magnelli. Other abstract expressionist painters associated with the Réalités Nouvelles include Serge Poliakoff and Alexandre Istrati. Dumitresco later married Alexandre Istrati

After a number of years working in black and white, she tackled the problem of colors, showing originality and a great freshness of colors in her compositions.

She and her husband are buried in the same grave with Constantin Brâncuși.

References
Read, Herbert. A Concise History of Modern Painting. 1959. Pg. 217.
Seuphor, Michael. A Dictionary of Abstract Painting. 1958. P. 166

External links
Artnet entry

1915 births
1997 deaths
20th-century French painters
20th-century French women artists
20th-century Romanian painters
20th-century Romanian women artists
Abstract expressionist artists
Artists from Bucharest
French women painters
Romanian women painters
Romanian emigrants to France